Alexandru Daniel Cristescu (born 24 May 1987) is a Romanian footballer who plays for Viitorul Liteni.

References

1987 births
Living people
Romanian footballers
Association football defenders
Liga I players
CSM Ceahlăul Piatra Neamț players
Liga II players
FCM Dunărea Galați players
ACS Foresta Suceava players